The Plaza Blocks, two courthouse squares known as Chapman Square and Lownsdale Square, are located in downtown Portland, Oregon, United States. The blocks are north of Terry Schrunk Plaza and east of City Hall. The northmost square is named after Daniel H. Lownsdale (1803—1862), a native Kentuckian who settled in Portland in 1845. The south square is named after legislator William W. Chapman (1808–1892), a Virginian settled in Portland in 1850.

By 1900 Lownsdale Square, traditionally a male-only space, was a gay cruising destination, allowing a degree of deniability. It was simply called "the park". The activity also took place in Chapman Square by the 1950s.

Southwest Main Street separates the two blocks; Thompson Elk Fountain, which was donated to the city by former Portland mayor David P. Thompson, has stood in the middle of the street.  The sculptor was Roland Hinton Perry.

The first electric power transmission line in North America terminated at Chapman Square.  It went online at 10:00 pm on June 3, 1889, operating at 4,000 volts of direct current, with the lines between the electric generating station at Willamette Falls in Oregon City, Oregon, and downtown Portland stretching about 13 miles.  A bronze tablet in the park commemorates this achievement.

See also

 List of parks in Portland, Oregon
 The Promised Land
 Fountain for Company H (1914)
 Spanish–American War Soldier's Monument (1906)

References

 
Parks in Portland, Oregon